Krzeczkowo-Stare Bieńki  is a village in the administrative district of Gmina Czyżew-Osada, within Wysokie Mazowieckie County, Podlaskie Voivodeship, in north-eastern Poland.

References

Villages in Wysokie Mazowieckie County